Guantánamo is the easternmost province of Cuba. Its capital is also called Guantánamo.  Other towns include Baracoa. The province has the only land border of the U.S. Navy base at Guantánamo Bay.

Overview
Guantánamo's architecture and culture is unlike the rest of Cuba. Guantánamo also has a high number of immigrants from Jamaica. Many buildings are comparable to those of the French Quarter of New Orleans in the U.S. state of Louisiana. 

The Nipe-Sagua-Baracoa mountains dominate the province, dividing both climate and landscape. The northern coast, battered by prevailing winds, is the wettest part of the country, while the south, sheltered and dry, is the hottest. The north is characterized by rainforests, while the south is arid and has many cacti.

Municipalities
Baracoa
Caimanera
El Salvador
Guantánamo
Imías
Maisí (La Máquina)
Manuel Tames
Niceto Pérez
San Antonio del Sur
Yateras (Palenque)

See also
Guantanamera
Parque Nacional Alejandro de Humboldt

References

External links

 
Provinces of Cuba
 States and territories established in 1976